Jean-Noël Crocq (born 15 March 1948 in Rennes) is a French classical clarinetist.

Crocq studied at the Conservatoire de Paris. He created Le clarinettiste débutant, a book of sheet music for beginning clarinetists. In 1974, he became the solo bass clarinetist for the orchestra of l'Opéra de Paris. He became the first professor of bass clarinet at Conservatoire de Paris in 1991. He is the president of Association Papageno, a chamber music advocacy group. He also collaborates with Buffet Crampon.

References 

1948 births
Living people
Musicians from Rennes
Conservatoire de Paris alumni
20th-century French musicians
French classical clarinetists
21st-century clarinetists